Confession is a 1929 American black and white short film directed by Lionel Barrymore and starring Robert Ames and Carroll Nye. It is based on a playlet by Kenyon Nicholson.

Cast
 Robert Ames as 1st Soldier
 Carroll Nye as 2nd Soldier
 Christiane Yves as 1st French Woman
 Yvonne Starke as 2nd French Woman

References

External links
 

1929 films
American black-and-white films
Films directed by Lionel Barrymore
Metro-Goldwyn-Mayer films
American short films
1929 short films